Rodney L. Lowman (born 1949) is an American psychologist, academic administrator and entrepreneur whose major contributions have been in the areas of career assessment and counseling, ethical issues in Industrial and Organizational Psychology (I-O Psychology), the integration of clinical psychology and I-O psychology and helping to develop the field of consulting psychology. In a study of the most prolific contributors to the Consulting Psychology Journal: Practice and Research, Lowman was rated the second highest contributor for articles for the period 1992–2007.

New directions in professional ethics 
Lowman's training in both Industrial-Organizational (I-O) and clinical psychology resulted in an interest in ethics. The field of Industrial and organizational psychology (Society of Industrial-Organizational Psychology [SIOP]) though being closely tied to both science and practice had not focused much on ethics in the practice of I-O psychology.  As chair of SIOP's Professional Affairs Committee, Lowman led the effort to create SIOP's first ethics casebook, which has since been expanded and published in two editions in a joint publication by APA and SIOP, The Ethical Practice of Psychology in Organizations. Lowman (both independently and with colleagues such as Drs. Richard Kilburg and Stewart Cooper) have conducted a large number of professional training programs for psychologists on the application of ethics in consulting and I-O psychology.

Contributions to developing the field of consulting psychology 
The field of consulting psychology has also been a focus of Lowman's professional work. He spearheaded and helped obtain the APA's approval for a set of guidelines for the training of professional consulting psychologists at the doctoral and post-doctoral levels.  In these training models the focus is on training at the individual, group and organizational levels. He edited a book that helped to advance Consulting Psychology as a discipline, the Handbook of Organizational Consulting Psychology. In 2011, he was the keynote presenter at the Responsible and Ethical Leadership conference, University of Johannesburg, South Africa and at the Consulting Psychology in Africa: Breaking New Ground conference sponsored by the University of South Africa in Pretoria.

Contributions to scholarly literature and journal editorships 
Beginning in 1989 Lowman has written or edited 8 books and monographs, over 100 journal articles, and has made hundreds of professional presentations around the world, primarily at professional meetings and conferences. His areas of specialization include: career assessment  and counseling, managed care in mental health, ethics and consulting psychology.

He has also edited two psychology journals. He served as founding editor of The Psychologist-Manager Journal (Society of Psychologists in Management [SPIM], and currently serves as editor of the flagship journal of consulting psychology, Consulting Psychology Journal: Practice and Research.

Recent publications include Lefkowitz & Lowman, 2010, Lowman, 2011a, Lowman, 2011a, Lowman, 2011b and Spetch, Howland and Lowman, 2011.

Professional training 
Lowman trained in Industrial-Organizational and Clinical Psychology at Michigan State University, (PhD, 1979) completing his clinical psychology internship at the Texas Research Institute of Mental Sciences (now housed in the University of Texas at Houston Medical School) in 1977–78.  His postdoctoral work was done at the University of Rochester (New York) Medical School's Marriage and Family Clinic and at Washtenaw County Community Mental Health Center in Ann Arbor.

Leadership roles in universities, for-profit organizations and professional associations 
In addition to his academic contributions, Lowman has also held numerous academic leadership positions including service as Department Head (Louisiana Tech University), Dean, Provost/Vice President for Academic Affairs and Acting President (Alliant International U.) and President (Lake Superior State University). His administrative duties have mostly been in the context of start-ups and turnarounds. He also founded and led for seven years The Development Laboratories, a private consulting firm, and currently heads careertestingandcoachin.com, a private firm. He serves on the Board of Leadership Worth Following, a management consulting firm based in Dallas.

Rodney Lowman has been actively involved in leadership roles in Professional Associations throughout his career, particularly in the APA, SCP and SPIM. In APA, he has served two terms on its governing board (APA Council), as Chair of its Board of Professional Affairs (BPA) and Board of Convention Affairs (BCA), as a member of its Committee on Professional Practice and Standards (COPPS), and on its prestigious Ethics Committee and Committee on Psychological Tests and Assessments.  He headed a committee advising Norman Anderson, the APA's chief executive officer. about strategic planning and an ad hoc committee on creating a values statement for the APA. His contributions were important in the creation of APA's mission statement and its first-ever vision statement. Lowman served as President of the Society of Consulting Psychology (2001) and of the Society of Psychologists in Management (1994). Currently he serves as Research Domain Leader, an elected position in the Society of Consulting Psychology and as editor of its flagship journal.

Awards 
Lowman received numerous awards and recognitions over the course of his career. He holds Fellowship Status in three divisions of APA: Clinical Psychology (Division 12), Consulting Psychology (Division 13), and I/O Psychology (Division 14). He was awarded the Richard Kilburg Service Award by the Society of Psychologists in Management and the Society of Consulting Psychology's Service Award. He also holds a diplomate in the American Board of Assessment Psychology. Lowman also currently serves as Distinguished Professor at Alliant International University in San Diego, CA USA and heads up its I-MERIT (multicultural/international) initiative there. From July - August, 2010 he also served as Visiting Distinguished Professor at Global City Innovative College and a distinguished lecturer at several universities including Polytechnic University of the Philippines, and St. Paul University, all in Manila, and at Palawan State University in Puerto Princesa, Philippines. He also served as a Distinguished Visiting Consultant at Profiles Asia International. He has been continuously listed in Who's Who in America for over 25 years.

Selected publications 

Books:

Lowman, R.L. (Ed.) (2013). Internationalizing multiculturalism: Expanding professional competencies for a globalized world. Washington D.C.: American Psychological Association.

Lowman, R.L. (Ed.) (2006). The ethical practice of psychology in organizations (2nd Ed.). Washington D.C.: American Psychological Association & Society of Industrial/Organizational Psychology.

Lowman, R.L. (Ed.) (2002). Handbook of organizational consulting psychology. San Francisco: Jossey-Bass.

Lowman, R.L. (Ed.) (1998). The ethical practice of psychology in organizations. Washington D.C.: American Psychological Association & Society of I-O Psychology.

Lowman, R.L., & Resnick, R.J. (Eds.) (1994). The mental health professional's guide to managed mental health care. Washington, D.C.: American Psychological Association

Lowman, R. L. (1993). Counseling and psychotherapy of work dysfunctions. Washington, D.C.: 	American Psychological Association.

Lowman, R.L. (1991). The clinical practice of career assessment: Interests, abilities & personality. Washington, D.C.: American Psychological Association.

Lowman, R. L. (1989). Pre-employment screening for psychopathology: A guide to professional practice.  Sarasota, FL: Professional Resource Exchange.

Book Chapters:

Lefkowitz, J., & Lowman, R.L. (2010). Ethics of employee selection.  In J.L.Farr, & N. Tippins (Eds.), Handbook of employee selection (pp. 571–590).  New York: 	Psychology Press (Taylor & Francis).

Lowman, R.L., & Richardson, L.M. (2008). Assessment of psychopathology. In B. Bolton (Ed.), Handbook of measurement and evaluation in rehabilitation – 4th Edition (pp. 175–207). Austin, TX: pro-ed.

Lowman, R.L. (2007). Executive coaching: The road to Dodoville needs paving with more than good assumptions. In R.R. Kilburg & R.C. Diedrich (Eds.), The wisdom of coaching. Essential papers in consulting psychology for a world of change (pp. 73–78). Washington, DC: American Psychological Association.

Lowman, R.L, Kantor, J., & Perloff, R. (2006). History of I-O psychology educational programs in the United States In L. L. Koppes  (Ed.) Historical perspectives in industrial and organizational psychology (pp. 111–137). Mahwah, NJ:  Lawrence Erlbaum Associates.

Footnotes

References 
 Ackerman, P.L., & Heggestad, E.D. (1997). Intelligence, personality, and interests: Evidence for overlapping traits. Psychological Bulletin, 121, 219–245.
 American Psychological Association (2007). Guidelines for education and training at the doctoral and postdoctoral levels in consulting psychology/Organizational consulting psychology. American Psychologist, 62, 980–992.
Carson, A.D. (1998). The integration of interests, aptitudes and personality traits: A test of Lowman's matrix.Journal of Vocational Behavior, 
Journal of Career Assessment,6),83-105.
Lefkowitz, J., & Lowman, R.L. (2010). Ethics of employee selection. In J.L.Farr,& N. Tippins (Eds.), Handbook of employee selection (pp. 571–590).  New York: Psychology Press (Taylor & Francis).
 Lowman, R.L. (1991). The clinical practice of career assessment: Interests, abilities & personality j9a. Washington, D.C.: American Psychological Association.
 Lowman, R. L. (1993a). Counseling and psychotherapy of work dysfunctions. Washington, D.C.: American Psychological Association.
 Lowman, R.L. (1993b). The inter-domain model of career assessment and counseling.Journal of Counseling & Development, 71, 549–554.
 Lowman, R.L. (Ed.) (2002). Handbook of organizational consulting psychology. San Francisco: Jossey-Bass.* Lowman, R.L. (Ed.) (2006).The ethical practice of psychology in organizations (2nd Ed.). Washington D.C.: American Psychological Association & Society of Industrial/Organizational Psychology.
 Lowman, R.L. (Ed.) (2006).The ethical practice of psychology in organizations (2nd Ed.). Washington D.C.: American Psychological Association & Society of Industrial/Organizational Psychology.
 Lowman, R.L.(2011a). A small world after all. In D.L. Anderson (Ed.),Cases and exercises in organization development & change (pp. 201–208). Los Angeles: Sage Publications.
 Lowman, R.L.(2011b). Risking your job: On striving to be an ethical leader in difficult organizational circumstances In W. B. Johnson & G.P. Koocher (Eds.),Casebook on ethically challenging work settings in mental health and the behavioral sciences(pp. 215–222). New York: Oxford University Press.
 Lowman, R.L., Williams, R.E., & Leeman, G.E. (1985). The structure and relationship of college women's primary abilities and vocational interests. Journal of Vocational Behavior, 27, 298–315.
 Lowman, R.L., & Resnick, R.J. (Eds.) (1994). The mental health professional's guide to managed mental health care. Washington, D.C.: American Psychological Association
 Lowman, R. L. (1989).  Pre-employment screening for psychopathology: A guide to professional practice. Sarasota, FL: Professional Resource Exchange.
 Mahoney, KT., Buboltz, Jr., W.C., Soper, B., Doverspike, D., & Simoneaux, B.J. (2008).Content analysis of Consulting Psychology Journal: Practice and Research (Volumes 44–59). Consulting Psychology Journal: Practice and Research, 60, 246–258.
 Spetch, A., Howland, A., & Lowman, R.L. (2011). EAP utilization patterns and employee absenteeism: Results of an empical, 3-year longitudinal study in a national Canadian retail corporation. Consulting Psychology Journal: Pracitce and Research, 60, 110–128.

External links 
siop.org
spim.org

21st-century American psychologists
American academic administrators
Lake Superior State University faculty
Louisiana Tech University faculty
Michigan State University alumni
Living people
1949 births
Alliant International University faculty
Heads of universities and colleges in the United States
20th-century American psychologists